Time-inhomogeneous hidden Bernoulli model (TI-HBM) is an alternative to hidden Markov model (HMM) for automatic speech recognition. Contrary to HMM, the state transition process in TI-HBM is not a Markov-dependent process, rather it is a generalized Bernoulli (an independent) process. This difference leads to elimination of dynamic programming at state-level in TI-HBM decoding process. The TI-HBM is able to model acoustic-unit duration (e.g. phone/word duration) by using a built-in parameter named survival probability. The TI-HBM is simpler and faster than HMM in a phoneme recognition task, but its performance is comparable to HMM.

References 

 Jahanshah Kabudian, M. Mehdi Homayounpour, S. Mohammad Ahadi, "Bernoulli versus Markov: Investigation of state transition regime in switching-state acoustic models," Signal Processing, vol. 89, no. 4, pp. 662–668, April 2009.
  Jahanshah Kabudian, M. Mehdi Homayounpour, S. Mohammad Ahadi, "Time-inhomogeneous hidden Bernoulli model: An alternative to hidden Markov model for automatic speech recognition," Proceedings of the IEEE International Conference on Acoustics, Speech and Signal Processing (ICASSP), pp. 4101–4104, Las Vegas, Nevada, USA, March 2008.

Speech recognition
Hidden stochastic models